The Mambwe are an ethnic and linguistic group from Kalambo District of Rukwa Region, Tanzania and northeastern Zambia. Like the Namwanga and other regional ethnic tribes, the Mambwe are said to have migrated from North East Africa. In 1987 the Mambwe population in Tanzania was estimated to number 63,000 .  The number of Mambwe in Zambia has not been independently estimated, though the combined number of Mambwe and Lungu in Zambia was estimated to be 262,800 in 1993 . The mambwe people of Zambia are known to be great businessmen owing to their interaction to their close cousins; the Namwanga, Swahili and Arabs traders.  They also distinguish the last names for males and females, like the Namwanga people, by applying prefixes "Si" and "Na" to be the first two letters of the last name e.g. Simwinga (Male) Namwinga (Female),
Simpokolwe (Male) Nampokolwe (Female)
Sikazwe (Male) & Nakazwe , Silupya (Male) & Nalupya (Female), Sinyangwe (Male) & Nanyangwe (Female), Sikasula (Male) & Nakasula (Female), Sinkamba (Male) & Nankamba (Female), Simusokwe (Male) & Namusokwe (Female), Sikasote (Male) & Nakasote (Female),Simakala (Male) & Namakala Simfukwe (Male) & Namfukwe (Female), Sinkala (Male) & Nankala (Nankala), Simbela (Male) & Nambela (Female), Sichilima (Male) Nachilima (Female) Simpungwe & nampungwe,simbeya(male) & nambeya(female) etc.
A meal of beans ("choli") and okra ("kumbi") are a mambwe staple and delicacy.

The Mambwe language and Cilungu, the Lungu language, are distinguished by minor dialect differences. The Mambwe people are known to be polygamous (impali), although this trend is slowly changing with religious affiliations, and advancements in modern schooling and trends. Like other African people, marriage is very important, although girls are known to marry earlier, often with pressure coming from parents and other relatives.

Ethnic groups in Tanzania
Ethnic groups in Zambia
Indigenous peoples of East Africa